The following is a list of currently operating NHS Wales local health boards and trusts.

Local health boards

NHS Wales trusts

See also 
 NHS Wales
 List of hospitals in Wales
 Healthcare in Wales

References

External links
 Directory of NHS Wales services
 StatsWales population estimates by health board

Healthcare in Wales
NHS Wales
Welsh NHS trusts